Dogali was a unique protected cruiser built for the Italian Regia Marina (Royal Navy) in the 1880s. Notably, she was the first warship equipped with triple-expansion engines. The ship was originally ordered by the Greek Navy and named Salamis, but she was sold to the Regia Marina before she was completed and renamed for the Battle of Dogali.

Dogalis career was uneventful; she served with the main Italian fleet for the first few years of her career and visited the United States in 1893 for the start of the World's Columbian Exposition. In January 1908, the ship was sold to Uruguay and renamed 25 de Agosto and later Montevideo. In 1914, the cruiser was withdrawn from service, but she was not disposed of until 1932 when she was sold for scrap.

Design

Dogali was designed by the British naval architect William Henry White and built at the Armstrong Whitworth shipyard at Elswick. She displaced . The ship was fitted with two pole masts, and originally, a sailing rig that was later removed. Revolving, armored spotting tops were mounted on the masts. She had a crew of 224 officers and enlisted men, though this was later increased to 247.

Dogali was powered by two-shaft triple-expansion engines, the first set of this kind of machinery ever installed in a warship. Steam for the engines was provided by four coal-fired cylindrical fire-tube boilers that were trunked into two funnels on the centerline. At the time of her commissioning, Dogali was among the fastest cruisers in the world.

The ship was armed with a main battery of six  L/32 guns all mounted individually in sponsons, with two side by side forward, two astern, and one amidships on each broadside. These were Pattern M guns manufactured by Armstrong Whitworth, and they weighed  apiece. Dogali was the only ship equipped with guns of this type. These were supplemented by a secondary battery of nine  L/40 guns and six Gatling guns. She was also equipped with four  torpedo tubes.

Service history
The keel for the new cruiser was laid down at Armstrong Whitworth on 13 February 1885, and the completed hull was launched on 23 December that year. The ship was originally ordered by the Greek Navy and was to be named Salamis, but she was purchased by Italy during construction. She was first renamed Angelo Emo, and then Dogali before being commissioned on 28 April 1887. The first half of the maneuvers tested the ability to attack and defend the Strait of Messina, and concluded in time for a fleet review by King Umberto I on the 21st. In 1890, Dogali participated in the annual fleet maneuvers in the First Squadron, along with the ironclad , the protected cruiser , and several torpedo boats. The exercises were conducted in the Tyrrhenian Sea, where the First Squadron was tasked with defending against an attacking "hostile" squadron.

Dogali and the protected cruisers  and  represented Italy at the international naval review in New York, held at the start of the World's Columbian Exposition in Chicago in 1893. The Exposition marked the 400th anniversary of Christopher Columbus's arrival in North America. Contingents from France, Germany, Britain, Spain, and several other nations also participated in the celebration. Later that year, Dogali and Giovanni Bausan were present in Rio de Janeiro, Brazil during the Revolta da Armada (Revolt of the Fleet), along with cruisers from Britain, France, Germany, Spain, and Argentina. The foreign warships were all tasked with protecting the interests of their respective nationals in the area. After returning to Italy later in 1893, she was assigned to the 3rd Department, which was stationed in Venice; she remained there through the following year. Later that year, she cruised off the eastern coast of South American in company with Umbria. She remained in the Cruiser Squadron through 1903, by which time the unit also included the armored cruiser , Giovanni Bausan and the protected cruiser .

In 1906, while cruising in North American waters, Dogali stopped at the Pensacola Navy Yard, where she had some maintenance done on her engines. Later that year she was present for a ceremony in Capitán Pastene, Chile, a town founded by Italian immigrants. In January 1908, the Italian government sold Dogali to Uruguay. She was renamed 25 de Agosto for the date Uruguay declared its independence. At the time, she was the largest warship in the Uruguayan Navy. In 1910, the ship was renamed Montevideo after the country's capital city. She was decommissioned in 1914, but remained in the Uruguayan Navy's inventory until 1932, when the old cruiser was finally sold to be broken up.

Footnotes

Notes

Citations

References

External links
 Dogali Marina Militare website 

Cruisers of the Regia Marina
1885 ships
Ships of the National Navy of Uruguay
Ships built by Armstrong Whitworth